Sing a Jingle is a 1944 American musical film directed by Edward C. Lilley and starring Allan Jones, June Vincent and Samuel S. Hinds.

Plot

Partial cast
 Allan Jones as Ray King 
 June Vincent as Muriel Crane 
 Samuel S. Hinds as J.P. Crane 
 Gus Schilling as Bucky 
 Betty Kean as Myrtle 
 Jerome Cowan as Andrews 
 Edward Norris as Abbott 
 Joan Castle as Vera Grant 
 Dickie Love as Wilbur Crane 
 Vivian Austin as Ann 
 William Newell as Wiggins 
 Dean Collins as Benny

References

Bibliography
 John Russell Taylor & Arthur Jackson. The Hollywood Musical. McGraw-Hill Book Co., 1971.

External links
 

1944 films
1944 musical films
American musical films
Universal Pictures films
Films directed by Edward C. Lilley
American black-and-white films
1940s English-language films
1940s American films